Justin Chrysostome Dorsainvil (1880–1942), also known as J.C. Dorsainvil, was a Haitian author and educator. Born in Port-au-Prince, Dorsainvil worked as a teacher and wrote books on such topics as science, politics, history, and Haitian society. Several of his books explored the Haitian religion of Vodou.

Selected works 
 Vaudou et Névrose (1931), English: Voodoo and Neurosis
 Une Explication Philologique du Vaudou (1924), English: A Philological Explanation of Voodoo
 Vaudou et Magie (1937), English: Voodoo and Magic
 Le Problème de l'Enseignement Primaire en Haïti (1922), English: The Problem of Primary Education in Haiti
 Quelques Vues Politiques et Morales (1934), English: Some Views of Policies and Morals

References

 

1880 births
1942 deaths
Haitian educators
Haitian non-fiction writers
Haitian male writers
People from Port-au-Prince
20th-century non-fiction writers
Male non-fiction writers